Baron Frederik (Fritz) Hartvig Herman Wedel Jarlsberg (7 July 1855– 27 July 1942) was a Norwegian aristocrat, jurist and diplomat.

Biography
Fredrik Wedel Jarlsberg was born in Christiania (now Oslo), Norway. He was the son of Baron Frederik Joachim  Wedel Jarlsberg (1819–1880) and Baroness Juliane Wedel Jarlsberg (1818–1872). On both his father and mother side, he was a member of a branch of Norway's foremost nobility.  He maintained the title of baron in Denmark, which had not abolished nobility titles following the separation of Denmark-Norway. Earlier in Norway, his family was officially recognised as barons. 

He studied law at the University of Christiania and graduated Cand.jur. in  1879.  He first became a professor and then entered diplomacy service. He was Norwegian-Swedish Minister in Madrid 1891-97 and 1902-05. In 1882 Wedel became secretary of the Ministry of Foreign Affairs in Stockholm.  He came to Vienna in 1885 and in 1888 to London as Chargé d'affaires. He became a Swedish-Norwegian minister in the Spanish court in 1891. He was active in Norwegian-Swedish diplomacy and played a central role in the 1905 dissolution of the union between these countries. He was offered the post as minister of foreign affairs three times.  He played a key role in the Svalbard Treaty of 1920, which granted Norway sovereignty over Svalbard. 

From 1898-1908, he established residence at Palsgård on the east coast of the Jutland. In his time as owner, a large park was built between  1898-1900 by the English landscape architect Edward Milner (1819-1884). In 1908 he sold Palsgård and in 1909 he bought Skaugum in Asker. The estate had a large main building, which Wedel redesigned  in French architectural style. He donated it to Crown Prince Olav at the time of his wedding to Princess Märtha of Sweden in 1929.

Personal life
Wedel Jarlsberg was married twice. In 1883 he was married with Alice Thekla Louise von Wagner (1861–1913) from one of Germany's  industrial families. After her death, he was married in 1916 with  an American heiress,  Mary von André, née Palmer (1859–1941).

He was the author of Reisen gjennem Livet (1932) and 1905 og Kongevalget (1946). He became a knight of the Order of St. Olav in 1892 and also held a number of foreign orders.  Wedel Jarlsberg Land on the southwestern part of Spitsbergen in Svalbard is named after him.

Wedel Jarlsberg vacated his Paris residence in Paris in 1940 when the German Military invaded France. He and his wife relocated to Lisbon, Portugal where he died during 1942.

See also
 Wedel-Jarlsberg

References

1855 births
1942 deaths
Diplomats from Oslo
University of Oslo alumni
Lawyers from Oslo
Nobility from Oslo
Danish nobility
Fritz
 Recipients of the St. Olav's Medal